The 2012–13 SV Wacker Burghausen season is the 83rd season in club history. The season started on 21 July 2012 and will finish on 18 May 2013. The club is participating in the 3. Liga, DFB-Pokal and Bavarian Cup. They play their home matches at Wacker Arena.

Review and events
The 2012–13 SV Wacker Burghausen season started on 21 July 2012 with a home loss to Preußen Münster and will end at home on 18 May 2013 against Arminia Bielefeld. The club is the participating in the 3. Liga, DFB-Pokal and Bavarian Cup.

Competitions

3. Liga

League table

Matches

DFB-Pokal

Bavarian Cup

Notes

References

Wacker Burghausen
SV Wacker Burghausen seasons